Filippo Bonamici, known professionally as Fil Bo Riva, is an Italian singer, songwriter, musician and producer. His style blends elements from indie rock, indie pop, folk and soul and is led by the timbre of his distinct voice.

Life 
Filippo Bonamici was born in Rome to an Italian father and a German mother. Around the age of 10 he started singing and playing guitar - he soon started his first band with his brother and two neighbors. Aged 14, he was sent to Cistercian College Roscrea, a Catholic boarding school in Ireland, where his musical education formed and developed gradually. After school, he lived in Madrid and Munich, working in different Jobs, before returning to Rome. In 2012, Bonamici moved to Berlin and started studying Design at the renowned Berlin University of the Arts (UdK). After several years of intense study and musical abstinence, he discovered fresh inspiration and positive distractions that shaped his songwriting. He dropped out of University in 2015 to pursue a career in music. Such new motivation led to the formation of Fil Bo Riva in 2015 and a brief period of busking. During this time, he met guitarist Felix A. Remm (first member of the live band) and producer Robert Stephenson. Together they started recording songs that would become Fil Bo Rivas acclaimed first EP, If You’re Right, It’s Alright.

In 2016, the Berlin based project artist to garner significant international attention after the release of debut single "Like Eye Did", and after multiple support slots – most notably with Milky Chance, Matt Corby, Imagine Dragons and Joan As Police Woman - the next step had to be taken. 2017 and 2018 proved to be watershed years – his first headline shows, three sold out tours, and playing at some of the most important European festivals like Montreux Jazz Festival, Lollapalooza, Eurosonic and The Great Escape Festival brought him some serious acclaim and a raft of new fans. During this time Bonamici kept working on his debut album and teasing fans with new music, readying what they knew would be his defining musical statement.

The debut album Beautiful Sadness was released in March 2019 on Humming Records with the third single L'impossibile reaching the top 30 in Italian radio.

In the same year he was also nominated for the Music Moves Europe Talent Award.

Discography 
EP
 2016: If You're Right, It's Alright (PIAS Recordings)

Album
 2019: Beautiful Sadness (Humming Records)

Singles

 2016: Like Eye Did
 2016: Franzis
2017: The Falling (Live Version)
 2017: Head Sonata
 2018: Go Rilla
 2018: L'over
 2019: L'impossibile
2019: Different But One
 2019: A Happy Song
 2019: Head Sonata (Acoustic Version)
 2020: Cold Mine
2021: Solo

Features
2022: Grapejuice-Oscar Anton (Feat. Fil Bo Riva)

References

External links 

 filboriva.com
 
 

Date of birth missing (living people)
Living people
Italian musicians
Italian people of German descent
Musicians from Rome
Year of birth missing (living people)
1990s births
Berlin University of the Arts alumni
People educated at Cistercian College, Roscrea